Louisiana Highway 21 (LA 21) is a state highway in Louisiana that serves St. Tammany and Washington Parishes.  It spans  and is signed north and south.

Route description
From the south, LA 21 begins at an intersection with LA 22 and LA 1077 in Madisonville, where LA 21 assumes the trajectory of LA 1077 and heads northeast. LA 1077 branches to the northwest before LA 21 intersects Interstate 12 (I-12). From south of I-12 and until joining U.S. Route 190 Business (US 190 Bus.) on 21st Avenue in Covington, LA 21 is multilaned, in places divided by a median or by a center turn lane, with some control of access.

Through most of Covington, LA 21 is in a mostly two-lane undivided highway concurrent with US 190 Bus., which returns to US 190 on the east side of Covington—an area known as Claiborne Hill. After intersecting US 190 and before leaving Covington cosigned as Military Road, LA 21 absorbs LA 36 and continues northeastward, absorbing LA 59 and entering a brief concurrency with Louisiana Highway 40 in Bush for less than one mile (1.6 km). Between Bush and Sun, LA 21 widens to a four lane, divided highway after merging Louisiana Highway 41, continuing due north from the merge. In Sun LA 21 absorbs LA 16 and continues northward to Bogalusa, where LA 21 intersects LA 10. LA 21 then runs north through Varnado and Angie before becoming Mississippi Highway 35 at the state line.

Major intersections

References

External links

LADOTD Map of State Highways
Louisiana State Highway Log

0021
Transportation in St. Tammany Parish, Louisiana
Transportation in Washington Parish, Louisiana